Lewis Balfour (1777–1860) was a Scottish minister of the Church of Scotland. He was a pivotal figure in the family life of Robert Louis Stevenson.

Life

He was born on 30 August 1777 at Pilrig House between Edinburgh and Leith, the son of John Balfour of Pilrig (1740–1814), son of James Balfour. His mother was Jean Whytt (1750–1833) of Bennochy Lodge near Kirkcaldy in Fife, daughter of Dr Robert Whytt, Professor of Medicine at Edinburgh University. He was christened on 14 May 1777 in South Leith Parish Church.

Lewis was educated at the High School in Edinburgh then studied Divinity at Edinburgh University. He was licensed to preach by the Church of Scotland in 1805 and in August 1806 he was ordained as minister of Sorn.

In 1823 James Earl of Lauderdale acted as his patron and in 1824 he was translated to Colinton parish south-west of Edinburgh and remained there for the rest of his life. From 1850 onwards his young grandson Robert Louis Stevenson was a frequent visitor.

He died at Colinton manse on 24 April 1860. He is buried in an open vault on the north side of Colinton Parish Church, between James Gillespie and Admiral John Inglis.

His position as minister of Colinton was filled by Rev Dr William Lockhart DD of Denny.

Family

He was married in the manse in Galston, East Ayrshire, on 26 April 1808 to Henrietta Scott Smith (born in 1787), third daughter of the Rev. Dr. George Smith DD (1748–1823), minister of Galston.

Mrs Balfour died in the manse in Colinton on 13 March 1844.

Their thirteen children included James Melville Balfour, George William Balfour and Margaret Isabella Balfour, the latter of whom married the lighthouse engineer Thomas Stevenson and bore the world-famous author Robert Louis Stevenson (christened Robert Lewis Balfour Stevenson, after his grandfather; but Lewis was changed to Louis to make it appear more French, and Balfour was dropped altogether). Another daughter, Henrietta Louisa Balfour (1822–1853), married R. H. Traquair, uncle of Ramsay Heatley Traquair. Among their other sons were Lewis Balfour (1817–1870), who became a merchant in Calcutta, and Mackintosh Balfour (1825–1894), who became a manager in the Bank of Bombay.

R. L. Stevenson's book A Child's Garden of Verses remembers his summers at Colinton manse.

The 1851 census has two young grandchildren, Lewis Balfour (born 1842 in India, died 1873), and John Boyle (born 1841 in India), both living at Colinton manse.

Family tree

Artistic recognition

A family photographic portrait is held in the Scottish National Portrait Gallery.

Publications
Sermon on the Death of Rev David Wilkie (1838)

References

1777 births
1860 deaths
Clergy from Edinburgh
19th-century Ministers of the Church of Scotland
Robert Louis Stevenson